James Lester Gillis Jr. (October 2, 1916 – February 26, 2018) was an American politician in the state of Georgia.

Gillis was born to the prominent Gillis family of Soperton, Georgia. His grandfather, Neil Gillis, was the founder of Treutlen County, Georgia, and a member of the Georgia House of Representatives and his father, Jim L. Gillis, Sr. was a former member of the Georgia State Senate, as was his brother Hugh Gillis. Jim L. Gillis, Jr. served on the Georgia Forestry Commission Board and is a former president of the American Turpentine Farmers Association, Georgia Forestry Commission, State Association of County Commissioners, Bank of Soperton, and Georgia Bankers Association. Gillis was a member of the board of directors at the Bank of Soperton from October 29, 1974, to September 28, 2016. He was a member of the Georgia Forestry Commission on February 14, 1977, until January 1, 2017 (being president from January 1981 to January 2007). He was the founder of the Ohoopee River Soil and Water Conservation District and a member of the National Association of Conservation Districts (NACD) Hall of Fame. He was a member of a conservation board for over 75 years, the longest term of any member ever. Gillis was the district supervisor of the Ohoopee River Soil Conservation District from 1939 to 2009.

He served in the Georgia State Senate in 1938 and from 1945 to 1946 and on the Treutlen County commission.

He turned 100 in October 2016 and died in February 2018 at the age of 101, over 80 years since his first gubernatorial election.

References

1916 births
2018 deaths
American centenarians
Democratic Party Georgia (U.S. state) state senators
Men centenarians
People from Henry County, Georgia
People from Soperton, Georgia